Ronald Moore may refer to:

Sports
Ron Moore (rugby), English rugby union and rugby league footballer of the 1930s
Ronnie Moore (born 1953), English football player and manager
Ron Moore (basketball) (born 1962), American basketball player
Ronald Moore (American football) (born 1970), running back
Ron Moore (defensive tackle) (born 1977), American football defensive tackle
Ronald Moore (basketball) (born 1988), American basketball player

Other
Ron Moore (boat builder), creator of the Moore 24 ULDB in Santa Cruz
Ronald Moore (Alberta politician) (1925–2010), Lacombe MLA Alberta, Canada
Ronald Moore (Manitoba politician) (1913–2003), Canadian politician from Manitoba
Ronald B. Moore, American visual effects producer
Ronald D. Moore (born 1964), screenwriter and television producer
Ronald Joseph Moore (1915–1992), New Zealand soldier
Ronald Lee Moore (1967–2008), American murderer